Askia Musa or Askiya Musa (ruled 1529–1531) was the second Askia ruler of the Songhai Empire. 

Towards the end of his reign, Askia Mohammad had become increasingly dependent on Ali Fulan, the Hugu-koray-koi (Master of the Palace interior). On one occasion, Ali advised that his young son Balla be appointed to the vacant position of Benga-farma (governor of Benga). When the older sons of Askia heard about this, they were angered as the post of Benga was very prestigious. Musa (his son) in particular was angry at his father and with Ali Fulan, he claimed that Askia did nothing but what Ali told him.

The closeness arose because Askia had become blind, however none of the sons were aware of it because Ali Fulan stuck so close to his side as aid (at this time blindness would have disqualified a ruler as he would have been expected to lead his army into battle, as well as being a bad omen). 

Musa resolved to depose his aging father Askia Mohammad I, this he achieved on 15 Aug 1529 in a bloodless coup. He then battled his kin to retain his position of power, in the process killing a number of his brothers and between 25 and 35 of his cousins. In 1531 a group of his brothers plotted against him and killed him.

Notes

References
.
. Also available from Aluka but requires subscription.

People of the Songhai Empire
1531 deaths
16th-century monarchs in Africa
Year of birth unknown